The Girl Who Came Back is a 1935 American crime film directed by Charles Lamont and starring Shirley Grey, Sidney Blackmer, and Noel Madison.

Cast
 Shirley Grey as Gilda Gillespie aka Mary Brown  
 Sidney Blackmer as Bill Rhodes  
 Noel Madison as Brewster  
 Matthew Betz as Smoky  
 Torben Meyer as Zarabella  
 May Beatty as Aunty  
 Frank LaRue as Detective Burke  
 Ida Darling as Mrs. Rhodes  
 Robert Adair as Charles Matthews  
 Edward Martindel as Chester Madison  
 John Dilson as Wadsworth

References

Bibliography
 Michael R. Pitts. Poverty Row Studios, 1929–1940: An Illustrated History of 55 Independent Film Companies, with a Filmography for Each. McFarland & Company, 2005.

External links

1935 films
1935 crime films
American crime films
Films directed by Charles Lamont
Chesterfield Pictures films
American black-and-white films
1930s English-language films
1930s American films